Danylo Yuriyovych Buhayenko (born 4 October 2002) is a Ukrainian professional footballer who plays as a left winger.

References

External links
 
 

2002 births
Living people
Footballers from Kyiv
Ukrainian footballers
Association football forwards
FC Vorskla Poltava players
Ukrainian Premier League players